Australian College of the Arts Pty Ltd (Collarts)  is an Australian independent tertiary education provider, with four campuses in Melbourne, Victoria.

Originally operating as AusMusic, Collarts was founded in 1993 and offers undergraduate degrees to on-campus and online students. Collarts also works closely with a number of secondary schools to provide VET music programs, offering music programmes to school students. Upon successful completion of a VET program, students are awarded a nationally-accredited vocational training certificate.

Collarts has four campuses across Melbourne, on Wellington Street and Cromwell Street in Collingwood, and George Street and Brunswick Street in Fitzroy.

As of May 2021, there were 1200 students enrolled at Collarts, studying both online and on-campus.

Acquisition 
In 2017, Collarts acquired the Mercer School of Interior Design, in order to expand further into the creative arts education industry. The merger coincided with the introduction of two courses: Music Production and Content Creation.

Accreditation 

 Registered Higher Education Provider
 Registered Training Organisation
 Accredited by the Tertiary Education Quality and Standards Agency (TEQSA)
 Accredited by the Australian Skills Quality Authority (ASQA)
 Registered on the Commonwealth Register of Institutions and Courses for Overseas Students (CRICOS)
 Member of the Australian Council of Private Education and Training (ACPET)
 Nationally recognised under the Australian Qualifications Framework

Courses 
Collarts offers undergraduate courses in:

 Animation & VFX
 Audio Engineering
 Digital & Social Media
 Dramatic Arts (Comedy)
 Entertainment Management
 Entertainment Journalism
 Fashion Marketing
Fashion & Sustainability
 Interior Design
 Music Performance
 Music Production
Photography
Screen media -  digital, broadcast and electronic media

Bachelor degrees are offered in Trimesters, and are completed within 2 years at a full time study load.

Starting in the 3rd Trimester, 2019, Collarts will begin offering their Diploma and Bachelor degrees in Dramatic Arts (Comedy). The course is recognised under the Australian Qualifications Framework, accredited until 28 March 2026.

Notable staff 

 Simon Ashford – Worked in animation on projects such as Balto, The Tales of Beatrix Potter, and The Silver Brumby
 Dallas Frasca – Front-woman of Dallas Frasca
 Ella Hooper – 4-time ARIA Music Awards winner and co-founder of Killing Heidi and The Verses
 Jesse Hooper – 4-time ARIA Music Awards winner and co-founder of Killing Heidi and The Verses
 Broden Kelly – Member of comedy group Aunty Donna
 Steve “Stevic” Mackay – Lead guitarist of Twelve Foot Ninja
 Ben O’Hara – Owner and operator of music business resource centre thebiz.com.au
 Tommy Rando – Australian performer, producer, singer-songwriter and composer
 Jon Toogood – Frontman of the New Zealand rock band Shihad
 Jason Torrens – Member of bands Bugdust and The Reefers, and owner/manager of Debasement Recording Studios.
 Chrissie Vincent – Worked with Grammy Award-winning artists and supported acts such as The Rolling Stones, David Bowie, Tim Rogers and Pete Murray
 Tim Watson – Member of ARIA Award winning group Taxiride.
 Tim Wild – Member of ARIA Award winning group Taxiride.

References

Australian College of the Arts 

Australian tertiary institutions